The 23rd Satellite Awards is an award ceremony honoring the year's outstanding performers, films, television shows, home videos and interactive media, presented by the International Press Academy.

The nominations were announced on November 28, 2018. The winners were announced on January 3, 2019, and the ceremony was held on February 22, 2019.

For this cycle of the Satellite Awards, the categories Best Film, Best Actor, and Best Actress were split into Drama and Comedy/Musical categories. Previously, they had been joined in one category since the 16th ceremony in 2011.

Special achievement awards
Auteur Award (for singular vision and unique artistic control over the elements of production) – Ryan Coogler
Mary Pickford Award (for outstanding contribution to the entertainment industry) – Rade Šerbedžija
Nikola Tesla Award (for visionary achievement in filmmaking technology) – Kevin Baillie
Best First Feature – Rupert Everett (The Happy Prince)
Ensemble: Motion Picture – The Favourite
Ensemble: Television – The Assassination of Gianni Versace: American Crime Story

Motion picture winners and nominees

Winners are listed first and highlighted in bold.

Films with multiple nominations

Films with multiple wins

Television winners and nominees

Winners are listed first and highlighted in bold.

Series with multiple nominations

Series with multiple wins

References

External links
 International Press Academy website

Satellite Awards ceremonies
2018 film awards
2018 television awards
2018 video game awards